Located North Laurel, Maryland in Maryland, United States.

The John T. Warfield house is a historic house in North Laurel. The site is currently owned by the Maryland Milk Producers Association.

John T. Warfield was a civil war draftee from Howard County. He married Rachel Virginia Dorsey, living at the 188-acre estate until 1899.

The house is a one-story three-bay-wide wood building on a stone foundation built in 1885 for John T. Warfield.
The Maryland State Highway administration hired the company Traceries to document the historical status of the property. The auditor described the site as non-historical, although John T. Warfield's other house of similar design, construction, era and architecture in Montgomery County was considered significantly historic

See also
Melvin J. Berman

References

Houses in Howard County, Maryland